Gjoa may refer to:

  (sailing sloop), a Norwegian sailing ship launched in 1872, the first ship to transit the Northwest Passage
 , the first transit of the Northwest Passage in 1903–1906, under the command of Roald Amundsen, aboard the ship Gjøa
 , a Norwegian cargo steamship
 Gjøa oilfield, an oilfield in the Norwegian sector of the North Sea, Atlantic Ocean.
 Gjöa Rupes (Gjoa Ridge) on Mercury
 Gjöa Bay, another name for Gjøahavn (Gjøa Harbour), see Gjoa Haven
  (Gjoa Sports Club), a Norwegian sports club in Oslo with a soccer team and ice hockey team

See also

 
 
 
 
 
 
 Gjoa Haven (disambiguation)